David Steele (1934 – 17 June 2019) was a British historian at the University of Leeds who focused on nineteenth-century British political history.

Academic career
Steele taught briefly at University College Dublin before becoming a Senior Lecturer in Modern History at the University of Leeds.  He remained at Leeds for 34 years until his retirement in 1999.

Steele's 1974 work on the Irish Land Acts, Irish Land and British Politics, grew out of his doctoral thesis. Michael Bentley ranked Steele's 1999 biography of Lord Salisbury with Andrew Roberts's work as the best guides to Salisbury's life. G. R. Searle said Steele's biography "brings out [Salisbury's] progressive impulses".

Selected publications
Irish Land and British Politics: Tenant-Right and Nationality, 1865–1870 (Cambridge: Cambridge University Press, 1974). 
Palmerston and Liberalism, 1855–1865 (Cambridge: Cambridge University Press, 1991). 
Lord Salisbury: A Political Biography (London: University College London Press, 1999).

References

1934 births
2019 deaths
Academics of the University of Leeds
British historians